Tarariras, is a small city in the south of the Colonia Department of southern Uruguay.

Geography

The stream Arroyo Cuaró flows a small distance east of the town.

History 
A populated centre was founded here in 1892, even though the origins date back to 1831 when José Rodríguez donated the lands of his property to Joaquín Viega. It received the name "Joaquín Suárez" and the status of "Pueblo" (village) by the Act of Ley N° 6.920 on 17 June 1919, and then on 27 August 1959 it was renamed to "Tarariras" and given the status of "Villa" (town) by the Act of Ley N° 12.621. Finally it received the status of "Ciudad" (city) by the Act of Ley N° 13.783 on 7 November 1969.

Population 
In 2011 Tarariras had a population of 6,632.
 
Source: Instituto Nacional de Estadística de Uruguay

Places of worship
 St. Joseph the Worker Parish Church (Roman Catholic)

Government 
The mayor (alcalde,-esa) of the town, as of July 2010, is Diana Olivera.

References

External links 
Tarariras' website 
INE map of Tarariras

Populated places established in 1892
Populated places in the Colonia Department